Unfinished Business may refer to:

Film and television

Film
Unfinished Business (1941 film), an American film by Gregory La Cava
Unfinished Business (1977 film), a Spanish film by José Luis Garci
Unfinished Business (1984 film), a Canadian film by Don Owen
Unfinished Business (1985 American film), a documentary film by Steven Okazaki
Unfinished Business (1985 Australian film), directed by Bob Ellis
Unfinished Business, a 1987 film starring Gina Hecht
Unfinished Business (2009 film), a South African mockumentary
Unfinished Business (2015 film), an American film by Ken Scott

Television

Series
Unfinished Business (TV series), a 1998–1999 British sitcom
The Amazing Race 18, or The Amazing Race: Unfinished Business, a 2011 American reality program

Episodes
"Unfinished Business" (Arrow), 2013
"Unfinished Business" (Bakugan: Mechtanium Surge), 2011
"Unfinished Business" (Battlestar Galactica), 2006
"Unfinished Business" (Everwood), 2004
"Unfinished Business" (Murder, She Wrote), 1986
"Unfinished Business" (Star Wars: The Clone Wars), 2020
"Unfinished Business" (Supernatural), 2018
"Unfinished Business" (White Collar), 2010

Literature
Unfinished Business: Paul Keating's Interrupted Revolution, a 2009 book by David Love
Unfinished Business: Women Men Work Family, a 2015 book by Anne-Marie Slaughter
Unfinished Business, a 1945 book by Stephen Bonsal
Unfinished Business, a 1993 book by Roger Douglas
Unfinished Business, a novel by Sheila Gordon
Unfinished Business: One Man's Extraordinary Year of Trying to Do the Right Things, a book by Lee Kravitz

Music

Albums
Unfinished Business, (After 7 album), 2021
Unfinished Business (Andy Bown album), 2011
Unfinished Business (Big Moe album), 2008
Unfinished Business (EPMD album), 1989
Unfinished Business (Eric Carr album), 2011
Unfinished Business (Jay-Z and R. Kelly album), 2004
Unfinished Business (Johnny Crash album), 2008
Unfinished Business (Loverboy album), 2014
Unfinished Business (Nathan Sykes album), 2016
Unfinished Business (Penal Colony album) or the title song, 2003
Unfinished Business (Ronnie Spector album) or the title song, 1987
Unfinished Business (Wanda Jackson album), 2012
Unfinished Business, by the Blackbyrds, 1976
Unfinished Business, by Danny Gatton, 1987
Unfinished Business, by Dave Davies, 1999
Unfinished Business, by Steve Goodman, 1987
Unfinished Business, an EP by Joan Jett, 2011

Songs
"Unfinished Business" (song), by White Lies, 2008
"Unfinished Business", by Boy George from Cheapness and Beauty, 1995

Sports
Deontay Wilder vs. Tyson Fury II, billed as Unfinished Business, a 2020 boxing match
UFC 49: Unfinished Business, a 2004 mixed martial arts event
WEC 18: Unfinished Business, a 2006 mixed martial arts event

Video games
Jagged Alliance 2: Unfinished Business, a 2000 expansion for the 1999 video game Jagged Alliance 2
Tomb Raider: Unfinished Business, a 1997 expansion pack for the 1996 video game Tomb Raider